Judith Tarr (born January 30, 1955) is an American fantasy and science fiction author.

Life 
Tarr was born in Augusta, Maine on January 30, 1955. She is the daughter of Earle A. Tarr, Jr. (a waterworks manager and salesman of real estate), and Regina (a teacher). She received her B.A. in Latin and English from Mount Holyoke College in 1976, and has an M.A. in Classics from Cambridge University, and an M.A. and PhD in Medieval Studies from Yale University. She taught Latin at Wesleyan University from 1990 to 1993.

She breeds Lipizzan horses at Dancing Horse Farm, her home in Vail, Arizona. The romantic fantasies that she writes under the name Caitlin Brennan feature "dancing horses" modeled on those that she raises.

The Hound and the Falcon Trilogy 
Tarr's The Hound and the Falcon trilogy  (The Isle of Glass, 1985; The Golden Horn, 1985; The Hounds of God, 1986) is a fantasy trilogy set in twelfth and thirteenth century Europe. The trilogy focuses on a race of Elves with supernatural powers, secretly living in medieval society. The trilogy's main character is Alf, a young monk who is also an Elf. The trilogy features historical personages such as Francis of Assisi and King Richard I as characters.

Alamut
In an interview, Tarr stated that she became interested in the period of the Crusades after hearing the 1971 record album, Music of the Crusades by David Munrow and the Early Music Consort of London. This inspired her to write her novel set in the period of the Crusades, Alamut. Tarr consulted the history books The Crusades Through Arab Eyes by Amin Maalouf and The Assassins: A Radical Sect in Islam by Bernard Lewis, as part of her research for Alamut.

Epona series
Tarr's Epona series of novels (White Mare's Daughter, 1998; The Shepherd Kings, 1999; Lady of Horses, 2000; Daughter of Lir, 2001) is set in prehistoric Europe. The Epona series dramatizes the ideas of archaeologist Marija Gimbutas about a matriarchal society existing in Paleolithic Europe.

Pseudonyms
 Caitlin Brennan, pseudonym used for the White Magic series (The Mountain’s Call and sequels) and House of the Star
 Kathleen Bryan, pseudonym used for the War of the Rose series (The Serpent and the Rose and sequels)

Bibliography

Novels
The Hound and the Falcon, 1993, a collection of earlier works:
The Isle of Glass, Bluejay, 1985, 
The Golden Horn, Bluejay, 1985, 
The Hounds of God, Bluejay, 1986, 
Avaryan Chronicles series:
The Hall of the Mountain King, Tor, 1986, 
The Lady of Han-Gilen, Tor, 1987, 
A Fall of Princes, Tor, 1988, 
Arrows of the Sun, Tor, 1993, 
Spear of Heaven, Tor, 1994, 
Avaryan Rising (omnibus of The Hall of the Mountain King, The Lady of Han-Gilen, and A Fall of Princes), Orb, 1997, 
Tides of Darkness, Tor, 2002, 
Avaryan Resplendent (omnibus of Arrows of the Sun, Spear of Heaven, and Tides of Darkness), Tor, 2003, 
A Wind in Cairo, Bantam Spectra, 1989, 
Ars Magica, Bantam Spectra, 1989, 
The Alamut series (set in the Middle East, and in the same universe as The Hound and the Falcon):
Alamut, Doubleday, 1989, 
The Dagger and the Cross, Doubleday, 1991, 
Blood Feuds (with S.M. Stirling, Susan Shwartz, and Harry Turtledove), Baen, 1993, 
Lord of the Two Lands, Tor, 1993  (about Alexander the Great)
His Majesty's Elephant, Jane Yolen Books, 1993,  (about Emperor Charlemagne) 
Blood Vengeance (with Jerry Pournelle, S.M. Stirling, Susan Shwartz, and Harry Turtledove), Baen, 1993, 
Throne of Isis, Forge, 1994,  (Historical novel featuring Cleopatra and Mark Antony) 
The Eagle's Daughter, Forge, 1995, 
Pillar of Fire, Forge, 1995,  (Historical novel set in Ancient Egypt)
King and Goddess, Forge, 1996, 
Queen of Swords, Forge, 1997, 
Epona:
White Mare's Daughter, Forge, 1998,  (Historical novel set in c. 4500 BC) 
The Shepherd Kings, Forge, June 1999 
Lady of Horses, Forge, June 2000, 
Daughter of Lir, Forge, June 2001, 
Household Gods (with Harry Turtledove), Tor, 1999, 
Kingdom of the Grail, Roc, September 2000,  (Fantasy novel where Roland (from the Matter of France) meets Merlin)
Pride of Kings, Roc, September 2001, 
Devil's Bargain, Roc, September 2002, 
House of War, Roc, November 2003, 
Queen of the Amazons, Tor, April 2004, 
Rite of Conquest, Roc, November 2004, 
King's Blood, Roc, October 2005, 
Bring Down the Sun, Tor, 2008, 
Living in Threes, Book View Cafe, 2014, 
Forgotten Suns, Book View Cafe, 2015,

Short fiction 

Stories

As Caitlin Brennan 
House of the Star, Starscape, 2010, 
The White Magic series
The Mountain's Call, Luna, 2004, 
Song of Unmaking, Luna, 2005, 
Shattered Dance, Luna, 2006,

As Kathleen Bryan 
The War of the Rose series
The Serpent and the Rose, Tor, 2007, 
The Golden Rose, Tor, 2008, 
The Last Paladin, Tor, 2009,

Awards
 The Isle of Glass was the winner of the 1987 William Crawford Award
 Short story "Death and the Lady" was second place for the 1993 Theodore Sturgeon Award
 Lord of the Two Lands was nominated in 1994 for the World Fantasy Award for Best Novel and the Locus Award for Best Fantasy Novel

See also
 Women science fiction authors

References

External links 

 
 Author's website
 
 Cover art, synopses and reviews at FantasyLiterature.net

1955 births
Living people
20th-century American novelists
20th-century American women writers
21st-century American novelists
21st-century American women writers
American alternate history writers
American fantasy writers
American historical novelists
American science fiction writers
American women novelists
Analog Science Fiction and Fact people
Mount Holyoke College alumni
Novelists from Connecticut
Wesleyan University faculty
Women historical novelists
Women science fiction and fantasy writers
Writers of fiction set in prehistoric times
Writers of historical fiction set in antiquity
Writers of historical fiction set in the Middle Ages
Yale University alumni
American women academics